NGC 463  is a lenticular galaxy located about 264 million light-years away from Earth in the constellation Pisces. It was discovered by French astronomer Édouard Stephan on December 16, 1871.

See also  
 Lenticular galaxy 
 List of NGC objects (1–1000)

References

External links 

Lenticular galaxies
Pisces (constellation)
0463
840
4719
Astronomical objects discovered in 1871